George Bulman may refer to:

George Bulman (fictional character), a British police detective of novels and a TV series
George Bulman (pilot) (1896–1963), chief test pilot for Hawker Aircraft